Maidstone State Park is a state park in the U.S. state of Vermont. The park is located in the town of Maidstone in Essex County in Vermont's Northeast Kingdom. One of the state's most remote parks, it provides public access to the  glacial Maidstone Lake in Maidstone State Forest. The park was developed by the Civilian Conservation Corps and opened in 1938. Activities include fishing, hiking, camping, boating, wildlife watching, and picnicking. The park is open from Memorial Day weekend to Columbus Day weekend; fees are charged for day use and camping.

Features
Maidstone State Park is located in rural western Maidstone, on the south and east sides of Maidstone Lake. The park consists of two separate areas, one for day use, and other for camping and hiking, accessed by Maidstone Lake Road. The picnic area includes fourteen stone fireplaces built by the CCC. About one mile south of the day use area is the larger  parcel, which includes two camping loops and extends into the hills south of the lake. Camping facilities include 34 tent/RV sites and 37 lean-tos, rest rooms with hot showers, and a sanitary dump station. Some of the leantos were built by the CCC.

History
The park was developed in 1938, and was one of the last of the Vermont state parks to be built by the Civilian Conservation Corps, a Depression-era jobs program.  The features developed by the park illustrate the rise of the automobile for vacation travel: not only is the park so remote that a car is needed to access it, but the CCC also built a parking lot at the day use area.  The park underwent a major upgrade to its infrastructure in the late 1970s, but has retained the basic feel of its early appearance.

See also
National Register of Historic Places listings in Essex County, Vermont

References

External links

Travel the Kingdom: Trails in Maidstone State Park

State parks of Vermont
Protected areas of Essex County, Vermont
Maidstone, Vermont
Civilian Conservation Corps in Vermont
Parks on the National Register of Historic Places in Vermont
National Register of Historic Places in Essex County, Vermont
Historic districts on the National Register of Historic Places in Vermont
1938 establishments in Vermont